Bing, Bing, Bing! is a 1995 album by jazz guitarist Charlie Hunter. This was his first album for the Blue Note Records and features his eight-string guitar.

The cover is an homage to Horace Parlan's 1960 album, Speakin' My Piece. The neon sign, 500 Club, is a bar in San Francisco's Mission District, a few blocks from the Elbo Room nightclub where the trio made a name for themselves.

Track listing
"Greasy Granny" – 4:34
"Wornell's Yorkies" – 3:58
"Fistful of Haggis" – 6:44
"Come as You Are" (Cobain) – 6:08
"Scrabbling for Purchase" – 4:49
"Bullethead" – 5:34
"Bing, Bing, Bing, Bing!" – 7:56
"Squiddlesticks" – 4:03
"Lazy Susan (with a client now)" – 6:15
"Elbo Room" – 5:58

Personnel
 Charlie Hunter – eight-string guitar
 Dave Ellis – tenor saxophone
 Jay Lane – drums
 Jeff Cressman – trombone on tracks 5 and 9
 Ben Goldberg – clarinet on tracks 5 and 9 
 David Phillips – pedal steel guitar on tracks 3 and 7
 Scott Roberts – percussion on tracks 2 and 3

Production
 Lee Townsend – producer
 Judy Clapp – mixing engineer
 Oliver DiCicco – engineer
 Christian Jones – engineer
 Greg Calbi – mastering

References

1995 albums
Charlie Hunter albums
Post-bop albums
Acid jazz albums
Blue Note Records albums